Bloomington is a hamlet in York Region, Ontario, Canada, in the town of Whitchurch-Stouffville. The hamlet is centred at the intersection of Ninth Line and Bloomington Road near the eastern boundary of the town of Whitchurch–Stouffville. Neighbouring communities within Whitchurch–Stouffville include Musselman Lake to the north, Lemonville to the west, and the community of urban Stouffville to the south. The hamlet of Goodwood in the town of Uxbridge lies to the east.

History
The first settlers arrived in the early 19th century, and were largely Quakers, Mennonites and United Empire Loyalists who had left the United States. The first postmaster, Samuel Patterson, registered the name Bloomington in 1869, likely after the city of Bloomington, Illinois.

There are a few reminders of the old hamlet that remain:

 Bloomington Schoolhouse - located at 13681 Ninth Line was built in 1898 as School Section No. 10 (with addition from 1952) and closed before 1971 and is now a private residence.

 Bloomington Cove Care Community - located on Ninth Line south of Bloomington Side Road

 Bloomington Gospel Church - built in 1874 the church dates back to 1833 and earlier church building on the east side of the Ninth Line

Economy

Bloomington is still mostly agricultural area, but some land is being developed for housing and few commercial businesses.

References

Communities in Whitchurch-Stouffville